Johann(es) Werner (February 14, 1468 – May 1522) was a German mathematician. He was born in Nuremberg, Germany, where he became a parish priest.  His primary work was in astronomy, mathematics, and geography, although he was also considered a skilled  instrument maker.

Mathematics
His mathematical works were in the areas of spherical trigonometry, as well as conic sections.  He published an original work on conic sections in 1522 and is one of several mathematicians sometimes credited with the invention of prosthaphaeresis, which simplifies tedious computations by the use of trigonometric formulas, sometimes called Werner's formulas.

Astronomy
In 1500 he observed a comet, and kept observations of its movements from June 1 until the 24th.

This work further developed the suggestion of Regiomontanus that the occurrences of eclipses and cometary orbits could be used to find longitude, giving a practical approach for this method by means of the cross-staff. (The approach did not actually solve the problem as the instrument was not sufficiently accurate.)

His trepidations method to describe precession of the equinoxes  was posthumously challenged in 1524 by Nicolaus Copernicus in The Letter against Werner.

Geography
He is most noted for his work, published in Nuremberg in 1514, a translation of Claudius Ptolemy's Geography. In it, he refined and promoted the Werner map projection, a cordiform (heart-shape) projection map that had been developed by Johannes Stabius (Stab) of Vienna around 1500. This projection would be used for world maps and some continental maps through the 16th century and into the 17th century. It was used by Mercator, Oronce Fine, and Ortelius in the late 16th century for maps of Asia and Africa. By the 18th century, it was replaced by the Bonne projection for continental maps. The Werner projection is only used today for instructional purposes and as a novelty.

In this work, Werner also proposed an astronomical method to determine longitude, by measuring the position of the moon relative to the background stars.  The idea was later discussed in detail by Petrus Apianus in his  (Landshut 1524) and became known as the lunar distance method.

Meteorology
Many consider Werner as a pioneer of modern meteorology and weather forecasting.
Between 1513 and 1520, Johann Werner made the first regular observations of the weather conditions in Germany.

Notable publications
, Nürnberg 1514
, Nürnberg, Petrejus 1522
 , Leibzig, B.G. Teubner 1907 [written early 16th century].
, 1546

Honours

The crater Werner on the Moon is named after him.

Some of the trigonometric identities used in prosthaphaeresis, an early method for rapid computation of products, were named Werner formulas in honor of Werner's role in development of the algorithm.

See also
 History of longitude

References

External links

Johann Werner
Werner Map Projection
Bonne Map Projection
Cordiform Map Projection

1468 births
1528 deaths
Scientists from Nuremberg
German cartographers
Medieval German mathematicians
15th-century German astronomers
German scientific instrument makers
16th-century German mathematicians
16th-century German astronomers
16th-century cartographers
16th-century geographers
16th-century Latin-language writers
16th-century German writers
16th-century German male writers
15th-century German mathematicians